Chandernagore Municipal Corporation or CMC (French: Corporation municipale de Chandernagor) is the local government that governs the city of Chandannagar in Chandannagore subdivision of Hooghly district, West Bengal, India.

History
Chandannagore Municipality was established in 1955, as per the Chandannagore Municipal Act, 1955 (WB Act XVIII of 1955). It became Chandannagore Municipal Corporation in 1994 as per the Chandernagore Municipal Corporation Act, 1990 (West Bengal Act XXXII  of 1990). From 2006, it has been governed by the West Bengal Municipal Corporation Act, 2006  (West Bengal Act XXXIX of 2006).

There was a French trading post at Chandannagar from 1673. It became a permanent French settlement in 1688. It was a part of French India till 1950, when Government of India took over the administration of Chandannagar. It was merged with the state of West Bengal on 2 October 1954.

Geography

Chandernagore Municipal Corporation covers an area of 22.03 km2 and has a total population of 166,771 (2011).

In 1981, 27.20% of the total population formed main workers and 72.80% were non-workers in Chandernagore Municipal Corporation and 44.77% of the total main workers were industrial workers. This may be interpreted as follows: although industrial activities are prominent in the municipal areas of the region, the major portion of the population is commuters and migrants find employment in the area.

Healthcare
Chandannagar Subvisional Hospital, with 250 beds, and Rupalal Nandi Cancer Research Centre, with 30 beds, are located in the Chandernagore Municipal Corporation area.

Elections
In the 2015 municipal elections for Chandernagore Municipal Corporation Trinamool Congress won 21 seats, CPI(M) 7 seats, Forward Bloc 1 seat, Congress 3 seats and  BJP 1 seat.

In the 2010 municipal elections for Chandernagore Municipal Corporation Trinamool Congress won 23 seats, CPI(M) won 7 seats,  Forward Bloc won 1 seat and Independents won 2 seats.

About the 2010 municipal elections, The Guardian wrote, "Today's municipal elections are unlike any for decades: the Communists, who have held West Bengal's main towns almost without a break since the 1970s, are facing disaster. This time defeat is likely to be definitive and could signal the beginning of the end for the Communist Party of India-Marxist [CPI(M)]."

In the 2005 municipal elections for Chandernagore Municipal Corporation, CPI(M) won 20 seats, Trinamool Congress 10 seats and others 3 seats.

References

 

Municipal corporations in India
Municipal corporations in West Bengal
1994 establishments in West Bengal